Silvia Ruegger (February 23, 1961 – August 23, 2019) was a long-distance runner from Canada, who represented her native country at the 1984 Summer Olympics in Los Angeles, California. She finished in eighth place in the women's marathon. She came first in the 1985 Houston Marathon in 2:28:36. She was born in Oshawa, Ontario, and grew up just south of the village of Newtonville, Ontario. She died in August 2019, at the age of 58.

Biography
Ruegger was born in Oshawa, Ontario in February 1961. She was inspired to run after watching the 1976 Summer Olympics in Montreal, and set herself a goal to compete at the 1980 Summer Olympics in Moscow. However, Canada was one of the many nations to boycott the games.

At the 1984 Summer Olympics in Los Angeles, Ruegger competed in the women's marathon, where she finished in eighth place, setting a new national record in the process. The following year, she won the 1985 Houston Marathon, setting another national record, one that would stand for 28 years. However, two weeks later, Ruegger was involved in a car accident. Despite this, her career lasted another eleven years, which included winning the 1987 Pittsburgh Marathon. She retired from long-distance running just before the 1996 Summer Olympics in Atlanta.

After her running career, Reugger setup a national programme, called Start2Finish, to help at-risk young people. In 2017, she was diagnosed with esophageal cancer. She died two years later, at the age of 58.

Achievements

References

External links
 
 Canadian Olympic Committee

1961 births
2019 deaths
Canadian female long-distance runners
Athletes (track and field) at the 1984 Summer Olympics
Olympic track and field athletes of Canada
Sportspeople from Oshawa
Canadian female marathon runners